Savumiamoorthy Thondaman (30 August 1913 – 30 October 1999; also spelled Saumyamurthy Thondaman or Saumiyamoorthy Thondaman) was a Sri Lankan politician who represented the Indian Tamils of Sri Lanka of which he was a member. At the time of his death, he was both the oldest and the seniormost member of the Sri Lankan Cabinet where he had served continuously for 21 years from 1978, under four Sri Lankan Presidents and the leader of the political party Ceylon Workers' Congress. He was succeeded by his grandson Arumugam Thondaman.

Further reading

Notes

References

External links
 Remembering S.Thondaman by A. Kandappah

1913 births
1999 deaths
Ceylon Workers' Congress politicians
Government ministers of Sri Lanka
Indian Tamil politicians of Sri Lanka
Indian Tamil trade unionists of Sri Lanka
Members of the 1st Parliament of Ceylon
Members of the 5th Parliament of Ceylon
Members of the 6th Parliament of Ceylon
Members of the 8th Parliament of Sri Lanka
Members of the 9th Parliament of Sri Lanka
Members of the 10th Parliament of Sri Lanka
People from Tamil Nadu
Sri Lankan Hindus
Sri Lankan people of Indian descent